Roger de Pins (1294 – 28 May 1365) was the grand master of the Knights Hospitaller from 1355 to the 1365.

Biography 

Little is known about de Pin's early life besides the fact that he came from Provence. Born in 1294, Roger de Pins came from a prominent family in the Knights Hospitaller, which included Odon de Pins, who served as grand master of the order from 1294 to 1296, and Giraud de Pins, who served as the papal appointed leader in Rhodes from 1317 to 1319 when there was conflict around the grandmaster Foulques de Villaret. 

He was elected grand master in September of 1355, succeeding Pierre de Corneillan. Soon after his accession, Pope Innocent VI called an assembly in Avignon, in which he imposed reform upon the Knights Hospitaller. The reform, however, also undermined the authority of de Pins and showed papal favor to an opponent of his, Juan Fernández de Heredia. 

In 1356, James of Piedmont, titular Prince of Achaea, proposed selling his title as Prince of Achaea to the pope. The pope considered buying it for the Hospitallers, but by the time the Hospitaller delegation arrived in Avignon in 1357, the titular Latin Emperor Robert II had refused to accept the deal, causing it to fall through.

Legacy 
Robert de Pins is primarily remembered for his generosity and compassion when he served as grand master of the order. It is said that during his reign Rhodes was hit by plague and famine, and de Pins provided for the people, only keeping what he needed to live.

References 

Grand Masters of the Knights Hospitaller
1294 births
1365 deaths
People from Provence